The McCoy Mountains are located in southeastern California in the United States. The southeast terminus of the range lies adjacent the western edge of the Parker Valley in a southern stretch of the Lower Colorado River Valley corridor.

Geography

The range lies in a northwest-southeasterly direction east of the Palen Mountains and south of the Little Maria Mountains. The mountain range is approximately 18 miles long and is located just north of Interstate 10, and about seven miles northeast of Chuckawalla Valley State Prison.

The mountains reach an elevation of 2,054 feet above sea level at McCoy Peak, at the southern end of the range. Downtown Blythe, California is about 10 miles to the east.

Palen/McCoy Wilderness Area
The McCoy Mountains are in the Palen/McCoy Wilderness Area, managed by the Bureau of Land Management.

Within the Palen-McCoy Wilderness are the Granite, McCoy, Palen, Little Maria, and Arica Mountains, which are five distinct mountain ranges separated by broad sloping Alluvial fans-baJadas. Because this large area incorporates so many major geological features, the diversity of vegetation and landforms is exceptional. The desert wash woodland found here provides food and cover for burro deer, coyote, bobcat, gray fox, and mountain lion. Desert pavement, bajadas, interior valleys, canyons, dense ironwood forests, canyons and rugged peaks form a constantly changing landscape pattern.

See also

:Category:Flora of the California desert regions
:Category:Protected areas of the Colorado Desert
:Category:Wilderness areas within the Lower Colorado River Valley
:Category:Bureau of Land Management areas in California

External links
Official Palen-McCoy Wilderness Area website
BLM Palen-McCoy Wilderness Map
Palen-McCoy Wilderness Area photographs

References

Mountain ranges of Riverside County, California
Protected areas of Riverside County, California
Mountain ranges of the Colorado Desert
Protected areas of the Colorado Desert
Mountain ranges of the Lower Colorado River Valley
Wilderness areas within the Lower Colorado River Valley
Bureau of Land Management areas in California
Blythe, California